Silex and the City is a comic book series created by Jul. The comic was adapted into an animated television show called The Darwinners.

Synopsis
The show is set in a comical version of the Stone Age, featuring the Dotcoms, a stone age family.

References

2009 comics debuts
Bandes dessinées
Comics adapted into animated series
Humor comics
Dargaud titles
Comics set in prehistory